Movses Baghramian was an 18th-century Armenian liberation movement leader.

He was born in Karabakh and lived in Russia. In 1763 he arrived with Hovsep Emin in Caucasus and participated in the organisation of an Armenian uprising against the Persian and Turkish invaders. From 1768, he lived in India and became an active member of Shahamir Shahamirian's group, propaganding libertarian ideas. In 1773 he published his "Tetrak, vor kochvi hordorak" book, he was one of the authors of the first constitution for Armenia (project).

References

 

Armenian nationalists
Armenian revolutionaries
People from Karabakh
Year of birth unknown
Year of death unknown